Arturo Rodas (born 3 March 1954, in Quito) is an Ecuadorian-born French-citizen composer.

Biography

Rodas studied at the National Conservatory in Quito, took private composition lessons with Gerardo Guevara, and also graduated in Law at the Universidad Central del Ecuador. Between 1978 and 1980 he was assistant to the French composer José Berghmans in Quito and Paris.  He studied at the École Normale de Musique de Paris from 1979-84.  There he graduated in counterpoint (Ginette Keller's class) and composition with Yoshihisa Taira as his mentor.  In 1983 he attended a composition course with Luciano Berio.  He also studied electroacoustic music with Mesias Maiguashca (CERM in Metz) and with Phil Wachsmann in London.  He has attended short courses at the IRCAM in Paris. While in París he also attended courses given in several institutions by Michèle Reverdy, Pierre Boulez,  Gerard Grisey, Guy Reibel and Iannis Xenakis.

He returned to Ecuador in 1984 where some of his orchestral works were performed by the National Symphony Orchestra conducted by Alvaro Manzano. In Ecuador he became one of the three "notable composers of the following generations".  The Banco Central del Ecuador issued a two-disk recording of Rodas works in 1988 as volume one of the series Compositores ecuatorianos contemporáneos. Included are Fibris, along with Arcaica, Clímax, Andino III, iOh. ...!,  Mordente, Espacios Invertidos".

"Arturo Rodas championed a contemporary, universal musical style within his country. A number of his works from this period, such as his aleatoric orchestral piece Fibris (1986), were published in Opus, a music magazine that Rodas co-edited. Since emigrating to England in 1990, he has composed works such as The Book of the Orchestra (2002-2003) which is intended to be performed in a house with many rooms so as to allow an “audience” to hear different instrumental groups as they wander from room to room". He has travelled back to Ecuador for concert and teaching activities. He has also worked as a music critic, editor and concert organiser. Rodas's works are published by Periferia Music (Barcelona) and Virtualscore (Paris).

Patterns: personal vision of his sources (Andino I-Andino IV, Laúdico); sound-mass polyphony (Entropía, Arcaica); aleatorism (Fibris, Ramificaciones Temporales); formal research (Obsesiva, La, Melodías de Cámara); and unavoidably the meeting point of patterns ("24.5 Preludios for piano", the "Atonal Fugues" and the opera "El Árbol de los Pájaros"). In that work the plot stems from the interaction music - architecture.

 Audio: Piece of Cake Suite in 4 movements, for piano & cd.  Pianist: Francis Yang

Works

Writings
 Rodas, Arturo. Análisis de la forma musical de Güilli Gu. Cultura magazine, Central Bank of Ecuador, vol IX no.26. Edited by Irving Iván Zapater,  September/December 1986: pp 387-402.
 Rodas, Arturo. La hora de Mesías Maiguashca,  Opus Magazine No. 15, September 1987: pp 17-19.
 Rodas, Arturo. Gerardo Guevara en la encrucijada musical,  Opus Magazine No. 15, September 1987: pp 20-21. Re-printed from magazine Impulso 2000, November 1987.
 Luis H. Salgado. Opus Magazine,  No. 31 (monographic), edited by Arturo Rodas. Central Bank of Ecuador, January 1989.

Scholarships and awards

1980-84 French Government scholarship.
1983 International contest for orchestral composition Max Deutsch, Paris.
1983 Centre Acanthes scholarship to study with Luciano Berio in Aix-en-Provence, France.
1983-84 École Normale de Musique scholarship.
1989-90 Grant from the UNESCO to write music.

Discography

Sources
 Béhague, Gerard. 2001. "Ecuador.  Art Music". The New Grove Dictionary of Music and Musicians, second edition, edited by Stanley Sadie and John Tyrrell. London: Macmillan Publishers; New York: Grove's Dictionaries of Music.
 Campos, Jorge. 2008, note for Periferia Music, Barcelona.
Enciclopedia de la música ecuatoriana. Corporación Musicológica Ecuatoriana (CONMUSICA). Edited by Pablo Guerrero Gutierrez. Quito, 2003.
 Walker, John L. 2001. "The Younger Generation of Ecuadorian Composers". Latin American Music Review 22, no. 2 (Fall/Winter): 199–213.
 Walker, John L. 2007. "Singing in a Foreign Land: National Identity and Proximity in Ecuadorian Music". Paper presented at the 2007 Congress of the Latin American Studies Association, Montréal, Canada, September 5–7.

Notes

External links

Data and recordings
 Arturo Rodas composer's website
  Arturo Rodas Digi-Arts, Unesco 
 Recordings of Rodas' works Reverbnation

Scores
 PERIFERIA Sheet Music Contemporary Publishing House, Barcelona.
 Virtualscore internet publishers, Paris

Ecuadorian composers
Living people
20th-century classical composers
French classical composers
French male classical composers
21st-century classical composers
French opera composers
Male opera composers
Composers for piano
École Normale de Musique de Paris alumni
People from Quito
Ecuadorian emigrants to France
Pupils of Gérard Grisey
20th-century French composers
21st-century French composers
20th-century French male musicians
21st-century French male musicians
1954 births